Odyssey Academy is a high/middle school in Greece, New York, United States. It is part of Greece Central School District. Odyssey maintains a population of slightly over 1,000 students, partially selected by random lottery from applicants across Greece, serving grades 6 - 12.

During the summer of 2012, Odyssey Academy moved from 133 Hoover Dr. to the former Apollo Middle School location at 750 Maiden Lane. 133 Hoover Dr. had been Hoover Drive Middle School before becoming Greece Odyssey in 1993, in 2004 it became Odyssey Academy and is one of the oldest school buildings in Greece (groundbreaking occurred in 1928 and opened in 1929) as the Willis N. Britton school and it started out as a K-8 building at the same time as Paddy Hill's formed Greece Consolidated School District #5 School and over in the Dewey Stone area Union Free District 15 was known as Barnard. It wasn't until the start of the 1961 school year that it started to be a junior high school for students in grades 7-9 and the elementary grades were divided up and sent to other district schools in Greece Central School District.

History of Odyssey Academy at 133 Hoover Drive

On July 9th, 1928, voters approved the acceptance of the donation of five acres of land in the Koda-Vista tract, from Willis N. Britton. The first formal organization of the first school board in 1929 was John Easton, Norman Weeks, Adelbert Lanctot, Arthur Kerkel, and Arthur Koerner. Norley Pearson was District Clerk. John Tallinger acted as Treasurer and Mr. Lanctot, President. Willis N. Britton officially opened in 1929 at a cost of $200,000 but they decide to tack on the building the third floor at that time so instead of building 2 stories at $200,000 they raised an additional $25,000 for a total of $225,000, and the original gross square foot of Willis N. Britton School was 40,326 square feet and 18 classrooms. In 1948 Willis N. Britton School gained its first expansion to the building and expanded the gross square footage by 29,134 square feet and 14 additional classrooms. In 1952 another addition was added to the school expanding the school to another 10 classrooms and 18,273 square feet to the building. In 1957 is when the gym was added to the building and 3,670 square feet were added to the building. Then in 1961/1962 the wing that housed the home ec and the technology shop was added that adding an additional 26,845 to the school. In 2004 another addition was added to the building for the Music Wing. The school did serve as a public library in the mid-1930s because Greece at the time did not have a central library until 1950 and no actual library building was built until 1960 so every six weeks the county would drop off 50 books at the school library and the school would open up a few hours each evening that adults could borrow books to read. 
More on the History of Hover Drives's Odyssey can be read in the Hover Drive's Odyssey 1929-1999 book that was put together by Marianne Himmelsbach and with the help of the school district, Jane Grant, Greece Central School District 1928-1988 in 1999 it is missing information from 1999-2012 before moving to its current location at 750 Maiden Lane. 

There is a memorial boulder located behind the softball field on the southeast end of the property at 133 Hoover drive that is for Miss Francis Howell who was killed in an automobile accident when she fell asleep at the wheel on the way home from a vacation in the hills of Pennsylvania it was placed there in 1953 as a dedication to the physical education teacher.

The was one problem with Odyssey being a neighbor to Kodak's Latona complex on the first day of school on September 7, 1989, both Hoover Drive and Buckman Heights elementary school were never able to attend the first day of school due to a chemical spill at Latona Road Complex for Kodak

The colors for the School from 1993 till 2000 were Purple Teal and White

Past Principals of Greece Central District # 1 / Hover Drive / Odyssey

 2nd Principal - Milton V Pullen
 7th Principal - Eugene Bowers
 8th Principal - Daniel Doran
 9th Principal - Ronald Nigro
 Current Principal - Corey Hepburn

National recognition
In 2006, Odyssey Academy was declared one of the Intel Schools of Distinction for "Leadership Excellence."
In 2007, the school was determined 109th best American public school on a list of 1,300 by Newsweek.
In 2008, Odyssey was listed 108th in the Newsweek Challenge Index of top public high schools in America. The index rates schools based on the number of students who take Advanced Placement and International Baccalaureate examinations relative to the size of the school.
In 2012, Odyssey was listed 75th in the Newsweek Challenge Index of top public high schools in America. Odyssey was also ranked 12th best in New York.

Musical productions
Odyssey Academy's past musical productions, dating back to 1994, have been Broadway Revue, Ransom of Red Chief, Wizard of Oz, Bye Bye Birdie, Oklahoma!, Fiddler on the Roof, Camelot, The Music Man, Kiss Me, Kate, Big: the musical, The Adventures of Tom Sawyer, Seussical, The Wiz, Annie Get Your Gun, Once on This Island, Footloose, Rags, Cinderella, The Wedding Singer, South Pacific, Honk!, Grease, The Sound of Music, Barnum, Big Fish, Freaky Friday, The Addams Family, Fame, Little House on the Prairie, and Into the Woods.  Productions which have earned the school many awards and nominations from the Rochester Broadway Theatre League's Stars of Tomorrow competition.

References

External links

Odyssey Sports Website
Hover Drive's "Odyssey" Hosted on the Greece Historical Society and Museum

Public high schools in New York (state)
Public middle schools in New York (state)
Schools in Monroe County, New York